Shumway is a village in Effingham County, Illinois, United States. As of the 2020 census, the village population was 188. Shumway is part of the Effingham, IL Micropolitan Statistical Area.

Geography
Shumway is located in northern Effingham County at  (39.184144, -88.652977). Illinois Route 33 crosses the southwest corner of the village, leading southeast  to Effingham, the county seat, and west  to Beecher City.

Education
Shumway is in the Beecher City/Shumway School District., although in earlier years, rural Shumway residents in Summit Township have filed petitions to leave the district. Older residents of this area still hold allegiances to Effingham High School. The reason for this "allegiance" was because when Shumway High School closed, many students east and south of Shumway went to Effingham schools. When districts were drawn many residents felt Beecher City gerrymandered Shumway into the district. Today, many kids around Lake Sara and east Shumway attend Beecher City, although Effingham Community schools are much closer.

Demographics

As of the census of 2000, there were 217 people, 82 households, and 56 families residing in the village. The racial makeup of the village was 100.00% White.

There were 82 households, out of which 40.2% had children under the age of 18 living with them, 47.6% were married couples living together, 17.1% had a female householder with no husband present, and 30.5% were non-families. 25.6% of all households were made up of individuals, and 11.0% had someone living alone who was 65 years of age or older. The average household size was 2.65 and the average family size was 3.18.

In the village, the population was spread out, with 28.1% under the age of 18, 12.9% from 18 to 24, 28.6% from 25 to 44, 19.4% from 45 to 64, and 11.1% who were 65 years of age or older. The median age was 31 years. For every 100 females, there were 102.8 males. For every 100 females age 18 and over, there were 100.0 males.

The median income for a household in the village was $43,125, and the median income for a family was $45,417. Males had a median income of $27,159 versus $18,750 for females. The per capita income for the village was $16,032. About 5.8% of families and 8.0% of the population were below the poverty line, including 8.0% of those under the age of eighteen and 15.4% of those 65 or over.

References

Villages in Effingham County, Illinois
Villages in Illinois